William Oliver Guillemont Lofts (2 September 1923 – 27 June 1997) was a British researcher and author.

Lofts was born in Marylebone, London in 1923, and attended Barrow Hill Road Elementary School. At sixteen he was working as an office boy, and still living at home at 146 Ashbridge Street in Marylebone.  During the Second World War, he enlisted in the Royal Artillery on 6 August 1942 and served in India and Myanmar for almost all of his service.  It was during his military service that he first became avidly interested in juvenile fiction, after coming across a "Sexton Blake" paperback in a deserted hut in 1944.

From the 1960s to the 1980s he worked for the legal department of IPC Magazines, mostly researching issues related to copyright.  He was deeply interested in boys' fiction, and spent years researching the topic, collaborating with another researcher Derek John Adley, on many bibliographic works.

Lofts' writings include The Saint and Leslie Charteris (1970) and The World of Frank Richards (1975).

Works

References 

1923 births
1997 deaths
British writers
People from Marylebone